Events from the year 1605 in Denmark.

Incumbents 
 Monarch – Christian IV

Events
 31 March  Isaac Pieterszoon van Amsterdam is appointed 'commissioner of the Sound', to ensure that Dutch trade ships would return to the Netherlands.

Undated
 Christian IV's 1st Greenland Expedition, cinsisting of the ships Trist Den Røde Løve and Katten, commanded by John Cunningham, is sent to Greenland to reestablish contact with the lost Norse settlementsand then to exploit the silver and gold ore supposedly returned by the first expedition.

Births
 6 April  Simon Paulli, physician and naturalist (died 1680)
 10 April  Christian, Prince-Elect of Denmark, prince of Denmark (died 1647) 
 30 April  Peder Winstrup, clergy (died 1679)

Deaths 
 18 October  Beate Clausdatter Bille,  noblewoman and Chief Lady-in-Waiting (born 1526)

References 

 
Denmark
Years of the 17th century in Denmark